Transmissions from the Satellite Heart is the sixth studio album by American rock band the Flaming Lips, released in 1993 by Warner Bros. Records. The album marked the departure of Jonathan Donahue (to Mercury Rev) and Nathan Roberts, and the addition of guitarist Ronald Jones and drummer Steven Drozd.

The track "She Don't Use Jelly" is notable for being the band's first charting radio hit, after its video was featured on the MTV series Beavis and Butt-Head nearly a year after the album's release. "Turn It On" was also a moderately successful single, and also had two different music videos, one of which was shot at a laundromat. By 2002, Transmissions from the Satellite Heart had sold 300,000 copies worldwide.

The EP Due to High Expectations... The Flaming Lips Are Providing Needles for Your Balloons was released the following year to promote the album and featured live versions of "Chewin the Apple of Yer Eye" and "Slow•Nerve•Action."

Critical reception
Trouser Press wrote that "as post-punk novelty singles go, 'She Don’t Use Jelly' ... is grade-A whimsy, with Coyne’s wobbly singing the perfect complement to the band’s loose-limbed rumble."

Track listing
All songs written by the Flaming Lips except where noted.

Personnel 
 Wayne Coyne – vocals, guitar
 Steven Drozd – drums, keyboards, guitar, vocals
 Michael Ivins – bass, backing vocals
 Ronald Jones – guitar, backing vocals
 Keith Cleversley – recording engineer, mixing engineer

Charts

References

1993 albums
The Flaming Lips albums
Warner Records albums